Elections to Carrickfergus Borough Council were held on 17 May 1989 on the same day as the other Northern Irish local government elections. The election used three district electoral areas to elect a total of 15 councillors.

Election results

Note: "Votes" are the first preference votes.

Districts summary

|- class="unsortable" align="centre"
!rowspan=2 align="left"|Ward
! % 
!Cllrs
! % 
!Cllrs
! %
!Cllrs
! %
!Cllrs
! %
!Cllrs
!rowspan=2|TotalCllrs
|- class="unsortable" align="center"
!colspan=2 bgcolor="" | UUP
!colspan=2 bgcolor="" | Alliance
!colspan=2 bgcolor="" | DUP
!colspan=2 bgcolor="" | PUP
!colspan=2 bgcolor="white"| Others
|-
|align="left"|Carrick Castle
|18.9
|1
|bgcolor="#F6CB2F"|35.5
|bgcolor="#F6CB2F"|2
|15.4
|1
|15.1
|1
|15.1
|0
|5
|-
|align="left"|Kilroot
|bgcolor="40BFF5"|42.1
|bgcolor="40BFF5"|2
|25.3
|1
|14.5
|1
|0.0
|0
|18.1
|1
|5
|-
|align="left"|Knockagh Monument
|23.4
|1
|21.9
|1
|19.2
|1
|0.0
|0
|bgcolor="AADFFF"|35.5
|bgcolor="AADFFF"|2
|5
|-
|- class="unsortable" class="sortbottom" style="background:#C9C9C9"
|align="left"| Total
|28.7
|4
|27.1
|4
|16.4
|3
|4.6
|1
|23.2
|3
|15
|-
|}

Districts results

Carrick Castle

1985: 2 x UUP, 1 x Alliance, 1 x DUP, 1 x PUP
1989: 2 x Alliance, 1 x DUP, 1 x UUP, 1 x PUP
1985-1989 Change: Alliance gain from UUP

Kilroot

1985: 3 x UUP, 1 x Alliance, 1 x DUP
1989: 2 x UUP, 1 x Alliance, 1 x DUP, 1 x Independent Unionist
1985-1989 Change: Independent Unionist leaves UUP

Knockagh Monument

1985: 2 x UUP, 1 x Alliance, 1 x DUP, 1 x Independent Unionist
1989: 2 x Independent Unionist, 1 x UUP, 1 x UUP, 1 x DUP
1985-1989 Change: Independent Unionist leaves UUP

References

Carrickfergus Borough Council elections
Carrickfergus